This is a list of windmills in Canada. Windmills feature uniquely in the history of New France particularly, where they were used as strong points in fortifications.

Alberta

Ontario

Manitoba

Quebec

References

Canada

Windmills
Windmills